Manganese is a chemical element with symbol Mn and atomic number 25.

Manganese may also refer to:
 Manganese, Minnesota, a ghost town 
 Manganese, West Virginia
 SS Manganese, a steamship

See also

 Mn (disambiguation)
 Isotopes of manganese